Englewood Station or Englewood Union Station in Chicago, Illinois' south side Englewood neighborhood was a crucial junction and passenger depot for three railroads – the Chicago, Rock Island and Pacific Railroad, the New York Central Railroad, and the Pennsylvania Railroad – although it was for the eastbound streamliners of the latter two that the station was truly famous. Englewood Station also served passenger trains of the New York, Chicago and St. Louis Railroad (Nickel Plate), which operated over the New York Central via trackage rights.

History
Englewood Station stood at the intersection of several rail lines:
The New York Central (NYC) and the Rock Island shared trackage from Englewood to the north into LaSalle Street Station. At Englewood, they split: the Rock Island headed southwest, the New York Central east into Indiana.
The Pennsylvania Railroad's (PRR) Pittsburgh, Fort Wayne and Chicago Railway crossed the Rock Island at this junction. To the north, its trackage headed into Union Station. The PRR then closely paralleled the NYC for several miles into Indiana.

Three-fourths of a mile west of this station, at 63rd Street and Wallace Street, stood another union station. Nicknamed "Little Englewood," the platforms and canopies still exist, although the station building is long gone.
The Erie Railroad, Monon Railroad, Wabash Railroad, Chicago and Eastern Illinois Railroad, and Chicago and Western Indiana Railroad.

The station itself stood near the corner of 63rd and State Streets and opened in 1898.

Englewood was the second stop eastbound, and penultimate such westbound, for both PRR's Broadway Limited and NYC's 20th Century Limited. Both trains would leave their respective terminals in Chicago, stop to embark passengers at Englewood, and leave the station simultaneously, each racing the other for several miles before they diverged.

At its peak the station serviced 52 of the 100 largest cities in the United States.

The westbound Rockets of the Rock Island also stopped at Englewood. Connections could be made at Englewood between any of the railroads at that intersection.

Upon the decline of intercity passenger traffic, and PRR and NYC's merger into Penn Central (and that railroad's bankruptcy and reorganization into Conrail), much of the trackage has been removed, and the commuter trains on the Metra Rock Island District no longer stop at the station, which was closed in the late 1970s. The former tracks of the Pennsylvania are now owned by the Norfolk Southern Railway and still carry freight and intercity Amtrak passengers to Union Station. The station was demolished in the late 70s, but some scattered remnants are visible around the railroad overpass near 63rd Street and State Street.

Notes

References

External links 

News Stand (Fred Harvey Exhibit)

Railway stations in Chicago
Former New York Central Railroad stations
Former Pennsylvania Railroad stations
Former Chicago, Rock Island and Pacific Railroad stations
Union stations in the United States
Former railway stations in Illinois
Former New York, Chicago and St. Louis Railroad stations
Former Amtrak stations in Illinois